Baie-Comeau (Manic 1) Airport  is located  south southwest of Baie-Comeau, Quebec, Canada.

See also
Baie-Comeau Airport
Baie-Comeau Water Aerodrome

References

External links
 Page about this airport on COPA's Places to Fly airport directory

Buildings and structures in Baie-Comeau
Registered aerodromes in Côte-Nord